Croatiella is a genus of plants in the family Araceae. It has only one known species, Croatiella integrifolia, endemic to Ecuador.

References

Aroideae
Monotypic Araceae genera
Endemic flora of Ecuador